The men's long jump event at the 2019 European Athletics Indoor Championships was held on 1 March at 10:03 (qualification) and 3 March at 11:35 (final) local time.

Medalists

Records

Results

Qualification

Qualification: Qualifying performance 7.95 (Q) or at least 8 best performers (q) advance to the Final

Final

References

2019 European Athletics Indoor Championships
Long jump at the European Athletics Indoor Championships